Fantasia is seventh studio album by Brazilian jazz artist Eliane Elias. The record was released in March, 1992 via Blue Note label. The vocal parts were performed by herself, her daughter Amanda Elias Brecker, and Ivan Lins. This record is one of her most acclaimed albums; Allmusic gave it 4½ stars out of five.

Reception
Ron Wynn of Allmusic wrote "Eliane Elias continues exploring Brazilian music on this latest release, doing both classics such as "The Girl From Ipanema" and a Milton Nasciemento medley, plus several Ivan Lins tunes. She uses alternating bassists and drummers, with Eddie Gomez, Marc Johnson, Jack DeJohnette, and Peter Erskine dividing time, plus Nana Vasconcelos on percussion, with Lins helping out on vocals."

Track listing

Personnel
Band
Piano, vocals, arrangements Producer – Eliane Elias
Bass – Eddie Gómez (tracks: 2, 4, 6, 7, 8), Marc Johnson (3, 5)
Drums – Jack DeJohnette (2, 4, 7, 8), Peter Erskine (3, 5)
Percussion – Naná Vasconcelos (1, 3, 5, 8)
Vocals – Amanda Elias Brecker (3), Ivan Lins (8)
Production
Producer – Eliane Elias
Recording engineer - James Farber
Mastering - Yoshio Okazaki
Art direction – Kaoru Taku

References

External links

1992 albums
Eliane Elias albums
Blue Note Records albums